Lauren Paige Nelson (born November 26, 1986) is a beauty queen from Lawton, Oklahoma who holds the Miss America 2007 title. Nelson is the second consecutive Miss America and sixth in the history of Miss America to hail from this state.

Early life and education
Nelson attended MacArthur High School and later graduated from University of Central Oklahoma with a degree in public relations.

Pageantry

Miss Teen Oklahoma 2004
Nelson was Miss Teen Oklahoma 2004, and in this role, she performed at the 2005 Miss America pageant.

Miss Oklahoma 2006
She won the Miss Oklahoma State Fair local title and then competed in the Miss Oklahoma pageant for the first time on June 11, 2006. On the final night of competition, she was crowned Miss Oklahoma 2006, for which she received a $16,000 scholarship. At age nineteen, she was the youngest contestant to become Miss Oklahoma.

Miss America 2007
Nelson went on to represent Oklahoma in the Miss America 2007 pageant that was broadcast on CMT from the Theatre for the Performing Arts on January 29, 2007. She won a preliminary swimsuit award on Thursday night, becoming her state's first swimsuit preliminary award since 1955. Her talent was a vocal performance, and her platform was, "Be NetSmart – Protecting Kids Online".

At the conclusion of the live telecast, Nelson was crowned Miss America 2007, beating first runner-up Miss Texas 2006, Shilah Phillips. She received a $50,000 scholarship award along with the title. She succeeded Jennifer Berry of Jenks, Oklahoma, this being the second occurrence of consecutive state winners since Mississippi took the Miss America title in both 1959 and 1960.

Personal life
Nelson married Randy Faram, a student minister, on October 24, 2009. Nelson gave birth to a son, Mason, in October 2013 and a daughter, Dawson Paige, in March 2016.

Miscellaneous
Nelson teamed up with host John Walsh on the FOX television show America's Most Wanted to assist in the apprehension of potential child predators, posing as a teenager online. Initial reports on  May 1, 2007, stated that she did not plan to return to testify against those predators that were apprehended, putting the prosecution's case in jeopardy. However, she appeared to change her mind later that day, and it was reported that she would testify against the perpetrators.

On January 17, 2008, Nelson appeared on Are You Smarter Than a 5th Grader? playing for the Miss America Organization. She won $175,000 before "dropping out."

On August 2, 2010, Nelson joined KWTV in Oklahoma City, a CBS affiliate, as a co-anchor of the station's 4 P.M. newscast, which was reformatted from a traditional newscast to a lifestyle-oriented newscast.

References

External links 
 
News9's Lauren Nelson

Miss America Kids website, offering a free child-safe web browser for children featuring Lauren Nelson

1986 births
Living people
People from Lawton, Oklahoma
Miss America winners
Miss America 2007 delegates
Methodists from Oklahoma
University of Central Oklahoma alumni
Miss America Preliminary Swimsuit winners
Television anchors from Oklahoma City
American women television journalists